The term "Woodstock of physics" is often used by physicists to refer to the marathon session of the American Physical Society’s meeting on March 18, 1987, which featured 51 presentations of recent discoveries in the science of high-temperature superconductors. Various presenters anticipated that these new materials would soon result in revolutionary technological applications, but in the three subsequent decades, this proved to be overly optimistic. The name is a reference to the 1969 Woodstock Music and Art Festival.

Before a series of breakthroughs in the mid-1980s, most scientists believed that the extremely low temperature requirements of superconductors rendered them impractical for everyday use. However, by March 1987, a flurry of recent research on ceramic superconductors had succeeded in creating ever-higher superconducting temperatures, including the discovery by the University of Houston's Paul Chu of a superconductor that operated at a temperature that could be achieved by cooling with liquid nitrogen. The scientific community was abuzz with excitement.

The discoveries were so recent that no papers on them had been submitted by the deadline. However, the Society added a last-minute session to their annual meeting to discuss the new research. The session was chaired by physicist M. Brian Maple, a superconductor researcher himself, who was one of the meeting's organizers. It was scheduled to start at 7:30 pm in the Sutton ballroom of the New York Hilton, but excited scientists started lining up at 5:30. Key researchers such as Chu and Karl Alexander Müller (who would win the 1987 Nobel Prize in Physics for his work in superconductors with Georg Bednorz) were given 10 minutes to describe their research; other physicists were given five minutes. Nearly 2,000 scientists tried to squeeze into the ballroom. Those who could not find a seat filled the aisles or watched outside the room on television monitors. The session ended at 3:15 am, but many lingered until dawn to discuss the presentations. The meeting caused a surge in mainstream media interest in superconductors, and laboratories around the world raced to pursue breakthroughs in the field.

By the following year (1988) two new families of copper-oxide superconductorsthe bismuth based or so-called BSCCO and the thallium based or TBCCO materialshad been discovered. Both of these have superconducting transitions above . So in the next March APS meeting at New Orleans a special evening session "Woodstock of Physics-II" was hastily organized to highlight the synthesis and properties of these new, first-ever 'triple digit superconductors'. The format of the session was same as in New York. Some of the panelists were repeats from the original "Woodstock" session. Additional researchers including Allen M. Hermann (at that time University of Arkansas), the co-discoverer of the thallium system, and Laura H. Greene (then with AT&T) were panelists. The 1988 session was chaired by Timir Datta from the University of South Carolina.

On March 5, 2007, many of the original participants reconvened in Denver to recognize and review the session on its 20-year anniversary; the "reunion" was again chaired by Maple.

Notes

References

External links

 Video recordings (published in 2016 by the American Physical Society, announcement: Experience the 1987 "Woodstock of Physics" Online)

Superconductivity
1987 in science
History of physics